The Overseas Community Affairs Council (OCAC; ; Pha̍k-fa-sṳ: Khièu-vu Vî-yèn-fi) is a cabinet-level council of the Executive Yuan of the Republic of China (Taiwan). The council was founded in 1926 in Canton (Guangzhou) in Kwangtung (Guangdong) Province.

Its main objective is to serve as a cultural, education, economic and informational exchanges organization between Taiwan and the overseas Taiwanese and Chinese descent communities. Its remit is not limited to expatriates from Taiwan, but includes all ethnic Taiwanese and Chinese living in a foreign country who "identify with the Republic of China (ROC)".

With the evolution of the political landscape and the Taiwanese localization movement, the organization now puts emphasis not only in Standard Chinese, but also on Taiwanese, Hakka, and other Taiwanese cultural expressions. It offers information about aboriginal tribes in Taiwan, and its overseas offices may serve, in addition to the Taipei Economic and Cultural Representative Offices.

Organizational structures
 Department of Policy Research and Development
 Department of Overseas Chinese Network Services
 Department of Overseas Chinese Education
 Department of Overseas Chinese Business
 Department of Overseas Chinese Student Counseling
 Secretariat Office
 Personnel Office
 Civil Service Ethics Office
 Accounting and Statistics Office
 Information Management Office
 Overseas Chinese News Agency
 Legal Affairs Committee

Title changes

The English title of the council was changed from "Overseas Chinese Affairs Commission" to "Overseas Compatriot Affairs Commission" in 2006, officially to "avoid being confused as a governmental body of the People's Republic of China", under the desinicization policies of independence-leaning President Chen Shui-bian of the Democratic Progressive Party. However, its English acronym OCAC and Chinese name remained the same, to reduce the expense for its official title change. After the Kuomintang renewed its mandate in the 2012 election, the official English name was changed back to the original.

However, in November 2012 there was a controversy when it was discovered that the OCAC used simplified Chinese characters in some of its teaching materials. Amid threats in November 2012 from Democratic Progressive Party legislators to freeze the OCAC's budget, its director relented to demands to rename the OCAC to the ROC (Taiwan) Overseas Community Affairs Council.

Ministers

Political Party:

Transportation
The council is accessible within walking distance North East from NTU Hospital Station of the Taipei Metro.

See also
 Overseas Taiwanese
 Overseas Chinese
 Political status of Taiwan
 Executive Yuan
 Taiwan Center for Mandarin Learning
 Overseas Chinese Affairs Office in Mainland China

References

External links

Overseas Community Affairs Council, Republic of China (Taiwan)
Overseas Community Affairs Council, Republic of China (Taiwan) (archive of old version)

1926 establishments in China
Executive Yuan
Diaspora ministries
Chinese diaspora
Taiwanese diaspora
Government agencies established in 1926
Overseas Chinese organisations